Agathon Jean François Fain (January 11, 1778September 16, 1837) was a French historian.

He was born in Paris, France. Having gained admittance to the offices of the Directory, he became head of a département. Under the French Consulate he entered the office of the secretary of state, in the department of the archives. In 1806 he was appointed secretary and archivist to the cabinet particulier of the emperor, whom he attended on his campaigns and journeys. He was created a baron of the empire in 1809, and, on the fall of Napoleon, was first secretary of the cabinet and confidential secretary.

Compelled by the second Restoration to retire into private life, he devoted his leisure to writing the history of his times, an occupation for which his previous employments well fitted him.

Of still greater importance for the history of Napoleon are Fain's , which were published posthumously in 1908; they relate more particularly to the last five years of the empire, and give a detailed picture of the emperor at work on his correspondence among his confidential secretaries. The first English edition, Napoleon: How He Did It - The Memoirs of Baron Fain, First Secretary of the Emperor's Cabinet, was published in 1998.

Immediately after the overthrow of Charles X, King Louis Philippe appointed Fain first secretary of his cabinet (August 1830). Fain was a member of the council of state and deputy from Montargis from 1834 until his death, which occurred in Paris on the 16 September 1837.

References

External links
 
 

19th-century French historians
1778 births
1837 deaths
French male non-fiction writers